The 1980s were the most successful decade in the existence of Belgium's national football team, as they appeared in four of the five major tournaments (European and World Championships) and also reached their best positions so far: second place at Euro 1980 and fourth place at the 1986 World Cup. Apart from their appearances at end stages, they ensured qualification for the 1990 World Cup during the last years of the decade. Overall, the balance was positive with 39 wins versus 24 losses (and 21 draws).

Results
84 matches played:

Notes

See also
 Competitive record of the Belgium national football team (with tournament history and all-time team record)

References

External links
 RSSSF archive of results 1904–
 eu-football.info Belgium national football team match results

football
1980s
1979–80 in Belgian football
1980–81 in Belgian football
1981–82 in Belgian football
1982–83 in Belgian football
1983–84 in Belgian football
1984–85 in Belgian football
1985–86 in Belgian football
1986–87 in Belgian football
1987–88 in Belgian football
1988–89 in Belgian football
1989–90 in Belgian football